The Anglo-Prussian Convention was agreed on 11 April 1758 between Great Britain and the Kingdom of Prussia formalising the alliance between them that had effectively existed since the Convention of Westminster in 1756.

The two states agreed not to negotiate a separate peace. Britain promised to pay the Prussians a subsidy in gold (£670,000 a year, larger than any wartime subsidies Britain had previous given to an ally.)  In exchange Britain hoped the Prussians would supply infantry and cavalry to the German Army of Observation commanded by Ferdinand of Brunswick to defend the Electorate of Hanover and neighbouring territories. Nicholas Magens and George Amyand supplied the money.

It was also agreed that the British would provide a garrison for the port of Emden, in 1757 re-captured from French and Austrian forces by the Allies. This was a significant development as Britain had previously refused to deploy troops on the Continent, and the Secretary of State, William Pitt had dismissed the prospect just months before.

Neither Britain or Prussia could foresee the actual length of the conflict nor the ultimate intra-alliance frictions that were to arise. Both sides believed at first that the war would not extend past one or two campaigns.

The Alliance between the two states lasted until 30 April 1762, when it was dissolved by John Stuart, 3rd Earl of Bute in acrimony. King George III supported Bute and George Grenville, against the Duke of Newcastle and Pitt.

References

Bibliography
 Dull, Jonathan R. The French Navy and the Seven Years' War. University of Nebraska Press, 2005.
 Szabo, Franz A.J. The Seven Years' War in Europe, 1756-1763. Pearson, 2008.
 Spencer, Frank (1956) THE ANGLO‐PRUSSIAN BREACH OF 1762: AN HISTORICAL REVISION. In: History, pp. 100–102.
 Schweizer, Karl W. (1977) Lord Bute, Newcastle, Prussia, and the Hague Overtures: A Re-Examination  Published online: 11 July 2014

Treaties of the Seven Years' War
Treaties of the Kingdom of Great Britain
Geopolitical rivalry
18th-century military alliances
1758 treaties
Treaties of the Kingdom of Prussia
Military alliances involving the Kingdom of Great Britain
Military alliances involving Prussia
1758 in Great Britain
1758 in Prussia
Prussia–United Kingdom relations
Treaties of the Silesian Wars